The Two of Us is the debut mixtape by American R&B duo Chloe x Halle. It was released on March 16, 2017 on YouTube.

Track listing

Personnel 
Production
 Chloe Bailey - executive production, production
 Halle Bailey - executive production, production 
 Steve Lacy - production 

Technical
 Tyler Scott - mixing, mastering
 Miles Comaskey - mixing, mastering
 Chloe Bailey - mixing, recording
 Tony Maserati - mixing 
 Halle Bailey - recording 
 Steve Lacy - recording

References

External links 
 
 The Two of Us on SoundCloud

2017 mixtape albums
Debut mixtape albums
Albums produced by Steve Lacy
Chloe x Halle albums